Lorand Gaspar (28 February 1925, in Târgu Mureș – 9 October 2019, in Paris) was a Hungarian–born French poet.

Life
Gaspar was born in February 1925 in Târgu Mureș, Romania. In 1943, he enrolled at Palatine Joseph University of Technology and Economics (today: Budapest University of Technology and Economics) in Engineering, was mobilized months later, and then imprisoned in a labor camp. He escaped in March 1945, and surrendered to the French in Pfullendorf.

He moved to France, where he studied medicine, becoming later a surgeon in France, then in Jerusalem, where he lived for sixteen years, and in Bethlehem and Tunis. He lived in Paris, where he was involved in medical research dealing with human psychology.

He published his first verse collection in 1966, Le Quatrième État de la matière (Flammarion) and published a number of prose works and travel books as a photographer.

He mastered several languages: to the languages learned as a child, Hungarian, Romanian and German, and later French, English, Latin, Greek and Arabic. He translated (in collaboration with Sarah Clair), Spinoza, Rilke, Seferis, D. H. Lawrence, Peter Riley, and Pilinsky.

Gaspar died in Paris in October 2019 at the age of 94.

Awards
 1998 Prix Goncourt de la Poésie

Works

English Translations
"from Nuits: An evening in front of the fireplace at Saint Rémy du Val", Jacket 14, translated by Peter Riley, July 2001

 Earth Absolute & Other Texts, translated by Mary Ann Caws and Nancy Kline, New York: Contra Mundum Press, 2015.
"Leaving Sidi Bou Said",The Fortnightly Review - New Series, translated by Amine Mouaffak and Sahar Taghdisi Rad, January 2019

French Language Works
 Le Quatrième État de la matière Paris: Flammarion, 1966. Prix Apollinaire, 1967.
 Gisements Paris: Flammarion, 1968.
 Histoire de la Palestine Paris : Maspero, 1968 et 1978.
 Palestine, année zéro Paris : Maspero, 1970.
 Sol absolu, Paris : Gallimard, 1972.
 
 Approche de la parole, Paris, Gallimard, 1978.
 Corps corrosifs, Fata Morgana, 1978.
 Egée suivi de Judée, Paris, Gallimard, 1980.
 
 Feuilles d'observation. Paris : Gallimard, 1986.
 Carnets de Patmos. Cognac : Le Temps qu'il fait, 1991.
 Égée, Judée, suivi d’extraits de Feuilles d’observation et de La maison près de la mer. Paris : Gallimard, 1993.
 Apprentissage. Paris : Deyrolle, 1994.
 Carnets de Jérusalem, Cognac, Le temps qu'il fait, 1997.
 Patmos et autres poèmes. Paris : Gallimard, 2001.
 Derrière le dos de Dieu. Paris : Gallimard, 2010.

References

External links

 Lorand Gaspar", Europe, (n°918, octobre 2005)
 "An interview with Lorand Gaspar", Contemporary French and Francophone Studies, Volume 7, Issue 2 Autumn 2003, pages 170 - 177, Elaine DalMolin

1925 births
2019 deaths
20th-century French historians
20th-century French poets
French-language poets
French medical writers
People from Târgu Mureș
Politehnica University of Bucharest alumni
Prix Goncourt de la Poésie winners
Prix Guillaume Apollinaire winners
Romanian–French translators
Romanian writers in French
Winners of the Prix Broquette-Gonin (literature)
20th-century translators